Hikmet Uluğbay (born 1939, Isparta, Turkey) is a Turkish politician.

Biography 
In 1961, he completed the Faculty of Political Sciences of Ankara University. He received a degree from Southern California University. He served at Ministry of Finance Tokyo and Permanent Mission to NATO Financial and Economic Counselor, OECD Permanent Representative Aid, Washington Embassy Economy and Trade Chief Advisor, Treasury General Directorate, Bilkent University Lecturer, XX. XXI. He served as Minister of National Education between 1997*1999 and Deputy Prime Minister in 1999.

On July 6, 1999, he attempted suicide with licensed guns, his tongue broke apart, however, he was miraculously survived. Prime Minister Bülent Ecevit stated that a crisis is stressful because of the International Monetary Fund (IMF) talks.

References 

Living people
1939 births
People from Isparta
Ankara University Faculty of Political Sciences alumni
University of Southern California alumni
Democratic Left Party (Turkey) politicians
Ministers of National Education of Turkey
Deputy Prime Ministers of Turkey